Clement Crabbe is the name of a fictitious columnist for the British Daily Mail newspaper. According to James Silver in The Guardian newspaper, the actual author of this satirical column is journalist Quentin Letts.

References 

Daily Mail journalists